Don Ferguson (born January 2, 1963) is a Canadian soccer coach and former professional player.

Club career
At age 17, he began playing professionally in Portugal in their national soccer league.

He then moved to England, where he joined first division club Luton Town. After leaving Luton he joined Welsh club Wrexham in the English fourth division, playing under non-contract terms in the 1985–86 season, making 20 appearances.

He also played professionally in Canada in the Canadian Professional Soccer League with Toronto Italia, Ottawa Pioneers/Intrepid, the North York Rockets, and Hamilton Steelers.

International career
Ferguson played for the Canadian Olympic team in 1983 helping them to qualify for the 1984 Olympics, although he did not play in the Olympics.

He also played for the Canadian national team, making three appearances.

Coaching career
After his playing career, Ferguson served as a youth soccer coach for a variety of youth soccer clubs in Ontario -  Brampton SC, Guelph SC, Bolton SC, Georgetown SC, Mississauga Falcons SC, Markham SC, Dixie SC, Toronto FC Academy, and Bryst Soccer Academy, as well as an Ontario Soccer Association Provincial Coach from 2007-2009 and a Durham Soccer Association Coach from 2010-2011. In 2005, he joined Aurora YSC as a youth soccer coach and joined their League1 Ontario competitive team, when launched in 2016.

Since 2011, he has served as the Goalkeeping coach for the University of Guelph men's and women's Gryphons soccer teams. With the Gryphons, he won an OUA championship and the 2016 bronze medal at the U SPORTS Championships with the Gryphon’s men’s program, and the 2017 OUA gold medal with the women's team.

For 2020, he became an assistant coach for North Mississauga in League1 Ontario.

In 2021, he joined expansion League1 Ontario club Guelph United serving as an assistant and goaltending coach.

He also serves as a coach for the Canadian para soccer team.

References

1963 births
Living people
Canada men's international soccer players
Canadian Soccer League (1987–1992) players
Canadian soccer players
Canadian people of Scottish descent
Association football goalkeepers
Luton Town F.C. players
Soccer players from Toronto
Wrexham A.F.C. players
North York Rockets players
Ottawa Intrepid players
Canadian National Soccer League players
English Football League players
Canadian expatriate soccer players
Expatriate footballers in England
Canadian expatriate sportspeople in Wales
Expatriate footballers in Wales
Canadian expatriate sportspeople in England
Toronto Italia players
Guelph Gryphons men's soccer coaches
Guelph Gryphons women's soccer coaches